Khanom may refer to:
Khanum, a female royal and aristocratic title
Khanom, the Thai word for dessert or snack. See Thai cuisine
Khanom District, Thailand
 Places in Iran:
 Khanom Kan
 Khanom Sheykhan

See also
 Khanam, a surname